The Tabarian calendar is the indigenous solar calendar of the Mazandaranis and Gilaks.

Months
Une Ma    
Arke Ma   
De Ma    
Vahmane Ma    
Nurze Ma    
Fardine Ma    
Kerche Ma    
Hare Ma    
Tire Ma    
Melare Ma   
Shervine Ma    
Mire Ma

See also

Caspian people and culture
 Tabarian New Year
 Tabarian culture
 Tabarian people
 Mazanderani
 Gilaki

Similar systems
 Armenian calendar

References
 Dr. Sadeq Kia; 1937; Tabarian Calendar and Festivals (Gahshomari va Jashnaye Tabari ).
 Jahangir Nasr Ashrafi; 2003; Dictionary of Tabari; Vol. 5, Article about Tabarian Calendar. 

Specific calendars
Mazandarani culture
History of Mazandaran Province
Tabaristan